Jack Stewart (1913–1966) was a Scottish actor. In addition to his movie roles, he appeared in many British television series.

Selected filmography

 The Gorbals Story (1950) - Peter Reilly
 Morning Departure (1950) - Leading Seaman Kelly
 Captain Horatio Hornblower R.N. (1951) - Seaman (uncredited)
 The Dark Light (1951) - Matt
 A Case for PC 49 (1951) - Cutler
 Hunted (1952) - Mr. Campbell
 The Brave Don't Cry (1952) - Willie Duncan
 Ghost Ship (1952) - 2nd Engineer
 The Kidnappers (1953) - Dominie
 Stryker of the Yard (1953)
 The Maggie (1954) - Skipper
 Trouble in the Glen (1954) - Thomas - the Gatekeeper (uncredited)
 Radio Cab Murder (1954) - Mac Gregson
 Johnny, You're Wanted (1956) - Inspector Bennett
 The Intimate Stranger (1956) - Constable Burton (uncredited)
 The Spanish Gardener (1956) - Police Escort
 The Steel Bayonet (1957) - Pvt. Wentworthy
 The Heart Within (1957) - Inspector Matheson
 The Carringford School Mystery (1958) - Gibson
 A Night to Remember (1958) - Stoker (uncredited)
 Kidnapped (1959)
 The Boy and the Bridge (1959) - Bridge Engineer
 Devil's Bait (1959) - Dr. MacKenzie (uncredited)
 Make Mine Mink (1960) - Police Radio Man (uncredited)
 The Frightened City (1961) - Tyson
 Strongroom (1962) - Sergeant McIntyre
 The Pirates of Blood River (1962) - Godfrey Mason
 The Amorous Prawn (1962) - 2nd Pub Customer
 A Matter of Choice (1963) - Mcintyre
 Tom Jones (1963) - MacLachlan
 The Three Lives of Thomasina (1963) - Birnie
 The Intelligence Men (1965) - Radio Man (uncredited)

References

External links

1913 births
1966 deaths
Scottish male film actors
Scottish male television actors
People from Larkhall
20th-century Scottish male actors